This is a list of foreign ministers in 2012.

Africa
 Algeria - Mourad Medelci (2007–2013)
 Angola - Georges Rebelo Chicoti (2010–2017)
 Benin - Nassirou Bako Arifari (2011–2015)
 Botswana - Phandu Skelemani (2008–2014)
 Burkina Faso - Djibril Bassolé (2011–2014)
 Burundi - Laurent Kavakure (2011–2015)
 Cameroon - Pierre Moukoko Mbonjo (2011–2015)
 Cape Verde - Jorge Borges (2011–2014)
 Central African Republic - Antoine Gambi (2009–2013)
 Chad - Moussa Faki (2008–2017)
 Comoros - Mohamed Bakri Ben Abdoulfatah Charif (2011–2013)
 Republic of Congo - Basile Ikouébé (2007–2015)
 Democratic Republic of Congo -
 Alexis Thambwe Mwamba (2008–2012)
 Raymond Tshibanda (2012–2016)
 Côte d'Ivoire 
Daniel Kablan Duncan (2011–2012)
Charles Koffi Diby (2012–2016)
 Djibouti - Mahamoud Ali Youssouf (2005–present)
 Egypt - Mohamed Kamel Amr (2011–2013)
 Equatorial Guinea -
 Pastor Micha Ondó Bile (2003–2012)
 Agapito Mba Mokuy (2012–2018)
 Eritrea - Osman Saleh Mohammed (2007–present)
 Ethiopia -
 Hailemariam Desalegn (2010–2012)
 Berhane Gebre-Christos (acting) (2012)
 Tedros Adhanom (2012–2016)
 Gabon -
 Paul Toungui (2008–2012)
 Emmanuel Issoze-Ngondet (2012–2016)
 The Gambia -
 Mamadou Tangara (2010–2012)
 Mambury Njie (2012)
 Mamadou Tangara (2012)
 Susan Waffa-Ogoo (2012–2013)
 Ghana - Muhammad Mumuni (2009–2013)
 Guinea
 Edouard Niankoye Lamah (2010–2012)
 François Lonseny Fall (2012–2016)
 Guinea-Bissau -
 Mamadu Saliu Djaló Pires (2011–2012)
 Faustino Imbali (2012–2013)
 Kenya -
 Moses Wetangula (2008–2012)
 Sam Ongeri (2012–2013)
 Lesotho - Mohlabi Tsekoa (2007–2015)
 Liberia -
 Toga McIntosh (2010–2012)
 Augustine Kpehe Ngafuan (2012–2015)
 Libya 
Ashour Bin Khayal (2011–2012)
Mohammed Abdelaziz (interim) (2012–2014)
 Madagascar - Pierrot Rajaonarivelo (2011–2013)
 Malawi -
 Peter Mutharika (2011–2012)
 Ephraim Chiume (2012–2014)
 Mali -
 Soumeylou Boubèye Maïga (2011–2012)
 Sadio Lamine Sow (2012)
 Tieman Coulibaly (2012–2013)
 Azawad -
Hama Ag Sid'Ahmed  (2012)
Hama Ag Mahmoud  (2012-2013)
 Mauritania - Hamadi Ould Baba Ould Hamadi (2011–2013)
 Mauritius - Arvin Boolell (2008–2014)
 Morocco -
 Taieb Fassi Fihri (2007–2012)
 Saadeddine Othmani (2012–2013)
 Western Sahara - Mohamed Salem Ould Salek (1998–2023)
 Mozambique - Oldemiro Balói (2008–2017)
 Namibia -
 Utoni Nujoma (2010–2012)
 Netumbo Nandi-Ndaitwah (2012–present)
 Niger - Mohamed Bazoum (2011–2015)
 Nigeria - Olugbenga Ashiru (2011–2013)
 Rwanda - Louise Mushikiwabo (2009–2018)
 São Tomé and Príncipe -
Manuel Salvador dos Ramos (2010–2012)
Natália Pedro da Costa Umbelina Neto (2012–2014)
 Senegal -
 Madické Niang (2009–2012)
 Alioune Badara Cissé (2012)
 Mankeur Ndiaye (2012–2017)
 Seychelles - Jean-Paul Adam (2010–2015)
 Sierra Leone -
 J. B. Dauda (2010–2012)
 Samura Kamara (2012–2017)
 Somalia -
 Mohamed Abdullahi Omaar (2010-2012)
 Abdullahi Haji Hassan Mohamed Nuur (2012)
 Fowsiyo Yussuf Haji Aadan (2012–2014)
 Somaliland - Mohammad Abdullahi Omar (2010–2013)
 Puntland - Daud Mohamed Omar (2010–2014)
 South Africa - Maite Nkoana-Mashabane (2009–2018)
 South Sudan - Nhial Deng Nhial (2011–2013)
 Sudan - Ali Karti (2010–2015)
 Swaziland - Mtiti Fakudze (2011–2013)
 Tanzania – Bernard Membe (2007–2015)
 Togo - Elliott Ohin (2010–2013)
 Tunisia - Rafik Abdessalem (2011–2013)
 Uganda -
 Sam Kutesa (2005–2021)
 Henry Oryem Okello (acting) (2011–2012)
 Zambia -
 Chishimba Kambwili (2011–2012)
 Given Lubinda (2012–2013)
 Zimbabwe - Simbarashe Mumbengegwi (2005–2017)

Asia
 Afghanistan - Zalmai Rassoul (2010–2013)
 Armenia - Eduard Nalbandyan (2008–2018)
 Azerbaijan - Elmar Mammadyarov (2004–2020)
 Nagorno-Karabakh -
Vasily Atajanyan (acting) (2011–2012)
Karen Mirzoyan (2012–2017)
 Bahrain - Sheikh Khalid ibn Ahmad Al Khalifah (2005–2020)
 Bangladesh – Dipu Moni (2009–2013)
 Bhutan - Ugyen Tshering (2008–2013)
 Brunei - Pengiran Muda Mohamed Bolkiah (1984–2015)
 Cambodia - Hor Namhong (1998–2016)
 China - Yang Jiechi (2007–2013)
 East Timor -
 Zacarias da Costa (2007–2012)
 José Luís Guterres (2012–2015)
 Georgia
 Grigol Vashadze (2008–2012)
 Maia Panjikidze (2012–2014)
 Abkhazia - Viacheslav Chirikba (2011–2016)
 South Ossetia
Murat Dzhioyev (1998–2012)
David Sanakoyev (2012–2015)
 India 
 S. M. Krishna (2009–2012)
 Salman Khurshid (2012–2014)
 Indonesia - Marty Natalegawa (2009–2014)
 Iran - Ali Akbar Salehi (2010–2013)
 Iraq - Hoshyar Zebari (2003–2014)
 Kurdistan - Falah Mustafa Bakir (2006–2019)
 Israel -
 Avigdor Lieberman (2009–2012)
 Benjamin Netanyahu (2012–2013)
 Palestinian Authority - Riyad al-Maliki (2007–present)
 Gaza Strip (in rebellion against the Palestinian National Authority) 
Muhammad Awad (2011–2012)
Ismail Haniyeh (acting) (2012–2014)
 Japan -
 Kōichirō Gemba (2011–2012)
 Fumio Kishida (2012–2017)
 Jordan - Nasser Judeh (2009–2017)
 Kazakhstan –
 Yerzhan Kazykhanov (2011–2012)
 Erlan Idrissov (2012–2016)
 North Korea - Pak Ui-chun (2007–2014)
 South Korea - Kim Sung-hwan (2010–2013)
 Kuwait - Sheikh Sabah Al-Khalid Al-Sabah (2011–2019)
 Kyrgyzstan -
Ruslan Kazakbayev (2010–2012)
Erlan Abdyldayev (2012–2018)
 Laos - Thongloun Sisoulith (2006–2016)
 Lebanon - Adnan Mansour (2011–2014)
 Malaysia - Anifah Aman (2009–2018)
 Maldives -
 Ahmed Naseem (2011–2012)
 Abdul Samad Abdulla (2012–2013)
 Mongolia -
 Gombojavyn Zandanshatar (2009–2012)
 Luvsanvandan Bold (2012–2014)
 Myanmar - Wunna Maung Lwin (2011–2016)
 Nepal - Narayan Kaji Shrestha (2011–2013)
 Oman - Yusuf bin Alawi bin Abdullah (1982–2020)
 Pakistan - Hina Rabbani Khar (2011–2013)
 Philippines - Albert del Rosario (2011–2016)
 Qatar - Sheikh Hamad bin Jassim bin Jaber Al Thani (1992–2013)

 Saudi Arabia - Prince Saud bin Faisal bin Abdulaziz Al Saud (1975–2015
 Singapore - K. Shanmugam (2011–2015)
 Sri Lanka - G. L. Peiris (2010–2015)
 Syria - Walid Muallem (2006–2020)
 Taiwan -
 Timothy Yang (2009–2012)
 David Lin (2012–2016)
 Tajikistan - Khamrokhon Zaripov (2006–2013)
 Thailand - Surapong Tovichakchaikul (2011–2014)
 Turkey - Ahmet Davutoğlu (2009–2014)
 Turkmenistan - Raşit Meredow (2001–present)
 United Arab Emirates - Sheikh Abdullah bin Zayed Al Nahyan (2006–present)
 Uzbekistan -
 Elyor Ganiyev (2010–2012)
 Abdulaziz Komilov (2012–present)
 Vietnam - Phạm Bình Minh (2011–2021)
 Yemen - Abu Bakr al-Qirbi (2001–2014)

Europe
 Albania -
 Edmond Haxhinasto (2010–2012)
 Edmond Panariti (2012–2013)
 Andorra - Gilbert Saboya Sunyé (2011–2017)
 Austria - Michael Spindelegger (2008–2013)
 Belarus
 Sergei Martynov (2003–2012)
 Vladimir Makei (2012–present)
 Belgium - Didier Reynders (2011–2019)
 Brussels-Capital Region - Jean-Luc Vanraes (2009–2013)
 Flanders - Kris Peeters (2008–2014)
 Wallonia - Rudy Demotte (2009-2014)
 Bosnia and Herzegovina -
 Sven Alkalaj (2007–2012)
 Zlatko Lagumdžija (2012–2015)
 Bulgaria - Nickolay Mladenov (2010–2013)
 Croatia - Vesna Pusić (2011–2016)
 Cyprus - Erato Kozakou-Marcoullis (2011–2013)
 Northern Cyprus - Hüseyin Özgürgün (2009–2013)
 Czech Republic - Karel Schwarzenberg (2010–2013)
 Denmark - Villy Søvndal (2011–2013)
 Greenland - Kuupik Kleist (2009–2013)
 Faroe Islands - Kaj Leo Johannesen (2011–2015)
 Estonia - Urmas Paet (2005–2014)
 Finland - Erkki Tuomioja (2011–2015)
 France -
 Alain Juppé (2011–2012)
 Laurent Fabius (2012–2016)
 Germany - Guido Westerwelle (2009–2013)
 Greece -
 Stavros Dimas (2011–2012)
 Petros Molyviatis (2012)
 Dimitris Avramopoulos (2012–2013)
 Hungary - János Martonyi (2010–2014)
 Iceland - Össur Skarphéðinsson (2009–2013)
 Ireland - Eamon Gilmore (2011–2014)
 Italy - Giulio Terzi di Sant'Agata (2011–2013)
 Latvia - Edgars Rinkēvičs (2011–present)
 Liechtenstein - Aurelia Frick (2009–2019)
 Lithuania - 
 Audronius Ažubalis (2010–2012)
 Linas Antanas Linkevičius (2012–2020)
 Luxembourg - Jean Asselborn (2004–present)
 Macedonia - Nikola Poposki (2011–2017)
 Malta 
 Tonio Borg (2008–2012)
 Francis Zammit Dimech (2012–2013)
 Moldova - Iurie Leancă (2009–2013)
 Transnistria -
 Vladimir Yastrebchak (2008–2012)
 Nina Shtanski (2012–2015)
 Monaco - José Badia (2011–2015)
 Montenegro -
 Milan Roćen (2006–2012)
 Nebojša Kaluđerović (2012)
 Igor Lukšić (2012–2016)
 Netherlands -
 Uri Rosenthal (2010–2012)
 Frans Timmermans (2012–2014)
 Norway -
Jonas Gahr Støre (2005–2012)
Espen Barth Eide (2012–2013)
 Poland - Radosław Sikorski (2007–2014)
 Portugal - Paulo Portas (2011–2013)
 Romania -
 Teodor Baconschi (2009–2012)
 Cristian Diaconescu (2012)
 Andrei Marga (2012)
 Titus Corlăţean (2012–2014)
 Russia - Sergey Lavrov (2004–present)
 San Marino  
 Antonella Mularoni (2008–2012)
 Pasquale Valentini (2012–2016)
 Serbia -
 Vuk Jeremić (2007–2012)
 Ivan Mrkić (2012–2014)
 Kosovo - Enver Hoxhaj (2011–2014)
 Slovakia -
 Mikuláš Dzurinda (2010–2012)
 Miroslav Lajčák (2012–2020)
 Slovenia -
 Samuel Žbogar (2008–2012)
 Karl Erjavec (2012–2018)
 Spain - José Manuel García-Margallo (2011–2016)
 Catalonia - Francesc Homs Molist (2012–2015)
 Sweden - Carl Bildt (2006–2014)
 Switzerland - Didier Burkhalter (2012–2017)

 Ukraine 
Kostyantyn Gryshchenko (2010–2012)
Leonid Kozhara (2012–2014)
 United Kingdom - William Hague (2010–2014)
 Scotland - Fiona Hyslop (2009–2020)
 Vatican City - Archbishop Dominique Mamberti (2006–2014)

North America and the Caribbean
 Antigua and Barbuda - Baldwin Spencer (2005–2014)
 The Bahamas -
 Brent Symonette (2007–2012)
 Fred Mitchell (2012–2017)
 Barbados - Maxine McClean (2008–2018)
 Belize - Wilfred Elrington (2008–2020)
 Canada - John Baird (2011–2015)
 Quebec -
Monique Gagnon-Tremblay (2010–2012)
Jean-François Lisée (2012–2014)
 Costa Rica - Enrique Castillo (2011–2014)
 Cuba - Bruno Rodríguez Parrilla (2009–present)
 Dominica - Roosevelt Skerrit (2010–2014)
 Dominican Republic - Carlos Morales Troncoso (2004–2014)
 El Salvador - Hugo Martínez (2009–2013)
 Grenada -
 Karl Hood (2010–2012)
 Tillman Thomas (2012–2013)
 Guatemala -
  Haroldo Rodas (2008–2012)
  Harold Caballeros (2012–2013)
 Haiti -
  Laurent Lamothe (2011–2012)
  Pierre Richard Casimir (2012–2014)
 Honduras - Arturo Corrales (2011–2013)
 Jamaica -
 Kenneth Baugh (2007–2012)
 Arnold Nicholson (2012–2016)
 Mexico 
Patricia Espinosa (2006–2012)
José Antonio Meade Kuribreña (2012–2015)
 Nicaragua - Samuel Santos López (2007–2017)
 Panama -
Roberto Henríquez (2011–2012)
Francisco Álvarez De Soto (acting) (2012)
Rómulo Roux (2012–2013)
 Puerto Rico – Kenneth McClintock (2009–2013)
 Saint Kitts and Nevis - Sam Condor (2010–2013)
 Saint Lucia - Alva Baptiste (2011–2016)
 Saint Vincent and the Grenadines - Douglas Slater (2010–2013)
 Trinidad and Tobago -
 Surujrattan Rambachan (2010–2012)
 Winston Dookeran (2012–2015)
 United States of America - Hillary Clinton (2009–2013)

Oceania
 Australia -
 Kevin Rudd (2010–2012)
 Craig Emerson (acting) (2012)
 Bob Carr (2012–2013)
 Fiji - Ratu Inoke Kubuabola   (2009–2016)
 French Polynesia - Oscar Temaru (2011–2013)
 Kiribati - Anote Tong (2003–2016)
 Marshall Islands -
 John Silk (2009–2012)
 Phillip H. Muller (2012–2014)
 Micronesia - Lorin S. Robert (2007–2019)
 Nauru -
 Sprent Dabwido (2011–2012)
 Kieren Keke (2012–2013)
 New Zealand - Murray McCully (2008–2017)
 Cook Islands - Tom Marsters (2010–2013)
 Niue - Toke Talagi (2008–2020)
 Tokelau -
 Foua Toloa (2011–2012)
 Kerisiano Kalolo (2012–2013)
 Palau - Victor Yano (2010–2013)
 Papua New Guinea -
Ano Pala (2011–2012) / Paru Aihi (2011–2012) (rival government)
 Sir Puka Temu (2012)
 Rimbink Pato (2012–2019)
 Samoa - Tuilaepa Aiono Sailele Malielegaoi (1998–2021)
 Solomon Islands -
 Peter Shanel Agovaka (2010–2012)
 Clay Forau Soalaoi (2012–2014)
 Tonga - Sialeʻataongo Tuʻivakanō (2010–2014)
 Tuvalu - Apisai Ielemia (2010–2013)
 Vanuatu - Alfred Carlot (2011–2013)

South America
 Argentina - Héctor Timerman (2010–2015)
 Bolivia - David Choquehuanca (2006–2017)
 Brazil - Antonio Patriota (2011–2013)
 Chile - Alfredo Moreno Charme (2010–2014)
 Colombia - María Ángela Holguín (2010–2018)
 Ecuador - Ricardo Patiño (2010–2016)
 Guyana - Carolyn Rodrigues (2008–2015)
 Paraguay -
Jorge Lara Castro (2011–2012)
José Félix Fernández Estigarribia (2012–2013)
 Peru - Rafael Roncagliolo (2011–2013)
 Suriname - Winston Lackin (2010–2015)
 Uruguay - Luis Almagro (2010–2015)
 Venezuela - Nicolás Maduro (2006–2013)

References

http://rulers.org

Foreign ministers
2012 in international relations
Foreign ministers
2012